WTV (Windows Recorded TV Show) is a proprietary video and audiovisual file container format, developed by Microsoft used for storing TV content recorded by Windows Media Center.  It is used in Windows Vista starting with Windows Media Center TV Pack 2008, and all Windows Media Center editions of Windows 7.  The WTV format is the successor to the earlier DVR-MS file format that was used in Windows XP Media Center Edition.

Multiple data streams (audio and video) are wrapped in a container with the file extension WTV. Video is encoded using the MPEG-2 and MPEG-4 standard and audio using MPEG-1 Layer II or Dolby Digital AC-3 (ATSC A/52). The format extends these standards by including metadata about the content and digital rights management.  Unlike the earlier DVR-MS format, WTV does not use ASF as the underlying container format.

Few software support parsing the WTV format such as:
 FFmpeg - Read and create
 HandBrake - Read
 CCextractor - Read

Some software packages support editing and converting WTV into other formats including removing commercials:
 MCEBuddy - Edit, convert and remove commercials

Known GUID of WTV
16 bytes unique Global identifier. Represented as hex value as stored.

References

External links
 Description of WTV file format
 Convert WTV with Handbrake
 Convert WTV with FFMPEG
 Edit and convert 

Computer file formats